The Lee County Courthouse, built in 1908, is a historic courthouse located at 123 S. Main Street in the city of Bishopville in  Lee County, South Carolina. It was designed in the Classical Revival style by Darlington native William Augustus Edwards who designed eight other South Carolina courthouses as well as academic buildings at 12 institutions in Florida, Georgia and South Carolina. Lee County was created in 1902 and this is the only courthouse it has ever had.

On October 30, 1981, it was added to the National Register of Historic Places.

See also
List of Registered Historic Places in South Carolina

References

External links 
 
 South Carolina Association of Counties page for Lee County
 University of Florida biography of William Augustus Edwards
 

County courthouses in South Carolina
William Augustus Edwards buildings
Buildings and structures in Lee County, South Carolina
Courthouses on the National Register of Historic Places in South Carolina
National Register of Historic Places in Lee County, South Carolina
Government buildings completed in 1908
1908 establishments in South Carolina